Call You may refer to:

"Call You", song by Reel Big Fish from Everything Sucks (Reel Big Fish album)
"Call You", song by Kodak Black from Heart Break Kodak
"Call You", song by Jonathan Hay from The Urban Hitchcock LP

See also
"Call Ya", song by Chapman Whitney from Chapman Whitney Streetwalkers
"Call Ya", song by Eleni Foureira from Gypsy Woman